is a Japanese trap shooter, who competed at three Olympic games and won the silver medal at the 2013 ISSF World Championships. Nakayama made her official Olympic debut at the 2000 Summer Olympics in Sydney, where she finished thirteenth in the women's double trap, with a score of 94 points, tying her position with Finland's Pia Julin.

At the 2008 Summer Olympics in Beijing, Nakayama competed in trap shooting, where she scored a total of 67 points in the qualifying round. She added nineteen more shots to obtain a total of 86 points in the final, but missed out of the bronze medal triumph to United States' Corey Cogdell, after competing in a four-person shoot-out

At the 2012 Summer Olympics in London, Nakayama, however, failed to qualify for the final, after hitting a total of sixty-five targets in women's trap shooting, finishing in fifteenth place, behind her former opponent and Olympic silver medalist Daina Gudzinevičiūtė of Lithuania

Nakayama currently lives in Utsunomiya, Tochigi, with her daughter.

References

External links
NBC Olympics Profile

Japanese female sport shooters
Living people
Olympic shooters of Japan
Shooters at the 2000 Summer Olympics
Shooters at the 2008 Summer Olympics
Shooters at the 2012 Summer Olympics
Shooters at the 2016 Summer Olympics
Sportspeople from Ibaraki Prefecture
People from Utsunomiya, Tochigi
1979 births
Asian Games medalists in shooting
Shooters at the 2006 Asian Games
Shooters at the 2010 Asian Games
Shooters at the 2014 Asian Games
Shooters at the 2018 Asian Games
Asian Games gold medalists for Japan
Asian Games silver medalists for Japan
Medalists at the 2010 Asian Games
Medalists at the 2014 Asian Games
Shooters at the 2020 Summer Olympics
21st-century Japanese women